In the Kingdom of the Goldhorn was the first Slovene feature film. It was filmed in 1928 and 1929 and was directed, shot and edited by Janko Ravnik. It was a silent film shot in the black-and-white technique. The film was produced by the mountaineering club Skala and was 107 minutes long. Only about two thirds of the original  film, i.e. the shortened 76-minute version, have been preserved until today.

The screenplay was written by Juš Kozak. The story tells about a trip by a student, a railway worker and a peasant to the Julian Alps, the people they meet on their way, and their ascent to Triglav.

In the Kingdom of the Goldhorn was released on 29 August 1931 in Grand Hotel Union in Ljubljana. It was well received by the public, but criticised in reviews as amateurish. The last time the film was shown to the wider public was on its 80th anniversary in Grand Hotel Union in August 2011. A commemorative stamp with a motif from the film was published by the Post of Slovenia on this occasion.

See also
The Slopes of Triglav, the second Slovene feature film (1932)
On Our Own Land, the first Slovene sound feature film (1948)

References

Slovene-language films
1931 drama films
Docudrama films
1931 films
Mountaineering films
Slovenian black-and-white films
Slovenian drama films
Films set in Slovenia